Lurøya is an island in the municipality of Lurøy in Nordland county, Norway. The  island is located just west of the island of Stigen and just north of the island of Onøya. Lurøya has a bridge connection to Onøya. The village of Lurøy is located on Lurøya, and that is the administrative centre of the municipality. Lurøy Church is located on the southwest side of the island. In 2017, there were 138 residents of the island.

See also
List of islands of Norway

References

Islands of Nordland
Lurøy